Gibson Dokyi Ampaw (born 25 September 1929) was a lawyer and a Ghanaian politician. He was a minister of state in the second republic.

Early life and education
He was born on 26 September 1929 at Kukurantumi, East Akim District in the Eastern Region.
He had his secondary education at Abuakwa State College, Kibi. He attended Fourah Bay College, Sierra Leone and the University of London, London where he was called to the bar at Lincoln's Inn.

Career
Ampaw began his career as a teacher at his alma mater Abuakwa State College. He was later appointed secretary of the Akyem Abuakwa State Council, and also taught at Wilberforce Memorial. He ventured into legal practice for eleven years as a barrister-at-law. Prior to politics he was a member of the board of directors of the Ghana Commercial Bank; he was a member of the bank's delegation which went to Lome, Togo to explore the possibility of opening a branch of the bank there. He also held directorship in various companies including Trans-Africa Engineering and Motor Industry (Ghana) Ltd., Susco Diamond Company, Accra Water Distillery Company and Industrial Agencies Ltd.

Politics
From 1969 to 1972 Ampaw was the member of parliament representing Abuakwa. He was appointed Minister for Health in 1969 and he served in that capacity until 1971.

Personal life
Ampaw was married with seven children. He is a Christian and his hobbies included football, volleyball, music and walking.

See also
Minister for Health (Ghana)

References

1929 births
Possibly living people
20th-century Ghanaian lawyers
Ghanaian MPs 1969–1972
Abuakwa State College alumni
Fourah Bay College alumni
Alumni of the University of London